Weightlifting at the 1988 Summer Paralympics consisted of seven events for men.

Participating nations 
There were 66 male competitors representing 21 nations.

Medal summary

Medal table 
There were 21 medal winners representing 12 nations.

Men's events 
Sources:

References 

 

1988 Summer Paralympics events
1988
Paralympics